The PF Fire was a wildfire that started near Hardin, Montana on June 18, 2021. The fire has burned  and was fully contained on August 4, 2021.

Events

July 
The PF Fire was first reported on July 27, 2021 at around 1:30 pm MST.

August

Cause 
The cause of the fire is believed to be due to a coal seam.

Containment 
On August 4, 2021, the PF Fire reached 100% containment.

Impact

Closures and Evacuations

See also 

 2021 Montana wildfires
 List of Montana wildfires

References 

2021 Montana wildfires
July 2021 events in the United States
August 2021 events in the United States
Wildfires in Montana